Rissoina costata is a species of minute sea snail, a marine gastropod mollusk or micromollusk in the family Rissoinidae.

Description

Distribution
This species occurs in the Indian Ocean off Aldabra.

References

 Sleurs W.J.M. (1989) A zoogeographical analysis of the rissoinine fauna of the eastern Pacific with special reference to a comparison with the Caribbean fauna and with a checklist of the eastern Pacific Rissoininae Stimpson, 1865 (Mollusca: Gastropoda). Annales de la Société Royale Zoologique de Belgique 119(2): 155-164.

External links
 

Rissoinidae
Gastropods described in 1851